Dichomeris monorbella is a moth in the family Gelechiidae. It was described by Viette in 1988. It is found in Madagascar.

References

Moths described in 1988
monorbella
Moths of Madagascar